Koitajoki (or the Koita River) is a river in Eastern Finland and partly in Russia in Northern Europe. Having its origin just by the international boundary in Ilomantsi of Northern Karelia in Finland, the Koitajoki River enters the territory of the Republic of Karelia in Russia, to return to Finland some  further south. It then flows northwest through the Petkeljärvi National Park and the Kesonsuo bog area, and further downstream receives the outflow from Lake Koitere.

Koitajoki is a tributary of Pielisjoki that flows from the lake Pielinen into Lake Pyhäselkä in Northern Karelia, Finland. It is part of the Vuoksi River basin in Finland and Russia, which flows through Lake Ladoga in Russia and further through the Neva River into the Gulf of Finland.

See also
List of rivers of Finland

References

Rivers of Finland
Rivers of the Republic of Karelia
Tributaries of the Vuoksi